Yanai may refer to:

Yanai, Yamaguchi, a city in Yamaguchi Prefecture, Japan
Yanai Station, a railway station in Yanai, Yamaguchi Prefecture, Japan
Yanai (Japanese surname)
Yannai, a Jewish surname
Yanai (Payetan), 7th-century Jewish poet